Japca is a commune in Florești District, Moldova. It is composed of two villages, Bursuc and Japca.

See also
Japca Monastery

References

Communes of Florești District
Populated places on the Dniester